Katerina Maleeva was the defending champion, but lost in the first round to Sandrine Testud.

First-seeded and wild card Brenda Schultz-McCarthy won the title, defeating Dominique Monami 7–6(7–5), 6–2 in the final.

The tournament marked the debut of 14-year-old Serena Williams in the WTA Tour. Williams entered the qualifying round, losing in the first round to Annie Miller.

Seeds

Draw

Finals

Top half

Bottom half

Qualifying

Qualifying seeds

Qualifiers

Qualifying draw

First qualifier

Second qualifier

Third qualifier

Fourth qualifier

References

External links
ITF tournament profile
Main and Qualifying Draw (WTA)

Challenge Bell
Tournoi de Québec
Can